The United Left Front was an electoral alliance in West Bengal, India, formed ahead of the 1962 West Bengal Legislative Assembly election. A key issue that provoked various left parties to join hands was the prevailing food crisis in the state. The front comprised the Communist Party of India, the All India Forward Bloc, the Marxist Forward Bloc, the Revolutionary Communist Party of India, the Bolshevik Party of India and the Revolutionary Socialist Party. The front won 74 seats out of 252.

Election result of the ULF

References

Defunct political parties in West Bengal
Defunct political party alliances in India
Political parties with year of disestablishment missing
Political parties with year of establishment missing